Facundo Bagnis and Guido Pella were the defending champions but chose not to defend their title.

Andrey Golubev and Nikola Mektić won the title after defeating Gastão Elias and Fabrício Neis 6–3, 6–3 in the final.

Seeds

Draw

External links
 Main Draw

Internazionali di Tennis Citta di Vicenza - Doubles
2016 Doubles